The 1982 Masters (officially the 1982 Benson & Hedges Masters) was a professional non-ranking snooker tournament that took place from Tuesday 26th to Sunday 31 January 1982 at the Wembley Conference Centre in London, England. As in 1981 12 players were invited to the tournament.

Steve Davis prevailed in the final by defeating Terry Griffiths, who made his third consecutive Masters final, 9–5 to go with the World, UK and the English Professional Championship titles he had won in the past year. Jimmy White made his debut, the first of 26 consecutive appearances at the Masters. Tony Meo equalled the tournament highest break of 136, set by Terry Griffiths the previous year, in his 5–0 quarter-final win against Cliff Thorburn, and spiritedly pulled back from 0–5 to 4–5 before losing 4–6 in semi-final against Davis.

Main draw

Final

Century breaks
Total: 3
 136  Tony Meo
 113, 102  Steve Davis

References 

Masters (snooker)
Masters Snooker
Masters Snooker
Masters Snooker